Smalls Jazz Club is a jazz club at 183 West 10th Street, Greenwich Village, New York City. Established in 1994, it earned a reputation in the 1990s as a "hotbed for New York's jazz talent" with a "well-deserved reputation as one of the best places in the city to see rising talent in the New York jazz scene". Its jazz musicians are noted for being "talented, though largely unknown" while its music is characterized as "modern versions of bebop and hard bop". The club's main room is in a basement with a capacity of 50 people that expanded to 60 people. Smalls Jazz Club should not be confused with Smalls Paradise in Harlem, which was founded in 1925 by Ed Smalls and closed in the 1950s.

History

Smalls Jazz Club was established in 1993 by Mitchell "Mitch" Borden, a former submariner, nurse, and teacher. Its target audience was characterized as young, bohemian, and talkative. Music commenced every night at 10:30 and at times lasted until 6:00 the following morning. The entrance fee was US $10.00; no alcohol was served. Musicians who performed in the early years include Ehud Asherie, Omer Avital, Noah Becker, Peter Bernstein, Avishai Cohen, Ari Hoenig, Guillermo Klein, Jason Lindner, Charles Owens, Kurt Rosenwinkel, Grant Stewart, Mark Turner, Tommy Turrentine, Richie Vitale, Michael Weiss, and Myron Walden. The house pianist was Frank Hewitt.

Financial difficulties led Borden to close Smalls on May 31, 2003. The closing was due to declining attendance after the September 11 attacks, rent increases in this neighborhood, and a smoking ban in indoor public places imposed by Mayor Michael Bloomberg. Concerts were moved into the Fat Cat Club next door, which was open four nights a week until 2:00 AM. In 2004, the Brooklyn Jazz Underground premiered with four shows at Smalls.

In early 2006, Borden and musicians Michael "Spike" Wilner and Lee Kostrinsky reopened Smalls. The club was restored and the sound quality was improved. Chairs were bought at 17 stoop sales. A poster of Louis Armstrong from the original Smalls hangs on the wall. There is a full-service bar. Smalls continues to be recommended as a top jazz club. The entrance fee was raised to US$20. The first music set begins at 7:30 PM. Instead of all night jazz sessions, there are two or three sets per night. All concerts are broadcast live on the club's website and are available in replay to subscribers. The renovated club has featured Bruce Barth, Aaron M. Johnson, Sacha Perry, Leon Parker, Steve Slagle, Peter Bernstein, Jimmy Cobb, Steve Davis, Joel Frahm, Kevin Hays, Ethan Iverson, Jazz Incorporated (Jeremy Pelt, Anthony Wonsey, Louis Hayes), David Kikoski, Ryan Kisor, Bill Mobley, Tim Ries, Jim Rotondi, and Neal Smith.

In 2013, the club started recording and streaming its daily performances over the internet. For a subscription fee, audiences could watch archived videos and live performances. The revenues generated from this subscription are split with artists.

During the COVID-19 pandemic, the club shifted to live-streaming daily performances over the internet, with minimal audiences allowed at times. The SmallsLive Foundation was created to receive sponsorships for these performances.

Record labels
Since 2007 the club has had record label produced by Luke Kaven,. The new owners of Smalls created the label Smalls Live, which publishes some concerts at the club. It is distributed by Harmonia Mundi.

Smalls Live discography
 Mark Soskin Quartet - Live At Smalls (Recorded January 16 & 17, 2015)
 Ian Hendrickson-Smith Quartet - Live At Smalls (Recorded January 17 & 18, 2014)
 Johnny O'Neal – Live at Smalls (Recorded June 16, 2013)
 Peter Bernstein – Live at Smalls (Recorded October 16 & 17, 2012)
 Frank Lacy – Live at Smalls (Recorded October 16 & 17, 2012)
 David Berkman – Live at Smalls (Recorded January 2 & 3, 2013)
 Rodney Green – Live at Smalls
 Will Vinson – Live at Smalls (Recorded December 4 & 5, 2012)
 Joe Magnarelli – Live at Smalls (Recorded August 31 & September 1)
 Alex Sipiagin – Live at Smalls (Recorded June 25 & 26, 2012)
 Harold Mabern – Live at Smalls (Recorded June 22 & 23, 2012)
 David Schnitter – Live at Smalls (Recorded November 11, 2012)
 Tyler Mitchell – Live at Smalls (Recorded April 15, 2012)
 Grant Stewart – Live at Smalls (Recorded April 6 & 7, 2012)
 Dezron Douglas – Live at Smalls (Recorded March 23 & 24, 2012)
 Ralph Lalama and Bop Juice – Live at Smalls
 The Jesse Davis Quintet – Live at Smalls(Recorded December 13, 14, 15, 2011)
 The Lage Lund Four – Live at Smalls (Recorded May 3 and 4, 2011)
 The Rick Germanson Quartet – Live at Smalls (Recorded July 15 & 16, 2011)
 Joel Frahm Quartet – Live at Smalls (Recorded February 28 & March 1, 2011)
 Bernstein, Goldings, Stewart – Live at Smalls (Recorded January 6, 7 & 8 2011)
 The Tim Ries Quintet – Live at Smalls (Recorded December 3 & 4, 2010)
 The Flail – Live at Smalls (Recorded October 8 and 9, 2010)
 Bruce Barth Trio – Live at Smalls (Recorded September 29 & 30, 2010)
 Cyrille Aimee And Friends – Live at Smalls (Recorded September 26 & 30, 2010)
 Jazz Incorporated – Live at Smalls (Recorded August 27 & 28, 2010)
 Spike Wilner Solo Piano – Live at Smalls (Recorded July & August, 2010)
 The Ben Wolfe Quintet – Live at Smalls (Recorded May 25 & 26, 2010)
 The Omer Avital Group – Live at Smalls (Recorded April 5 & 6, 2010)
 Ari Hoenig and Punkbop – Live at Smalls (Recorded February 8, 2010)
 The Jimmy Greene Quartet – Live at Smalls (Recorded February 19 & 20, 2010)
 Planet Jazz – Live at Smalls (Recorded January 8 & 9, 2010)
 Ethan Iverson, Ben Street, Albert Tootie Heath – Live at Smalls (Recorded November 16, 17 & 18 2009)
 The Jim Rotondi Quintet – Live at Smalls (Recorded October 21 & 22, 2009)
 The Seamus Blake Quintet – Live at Smalls (Recorded August 31 & September 1, 2009)
 The Neal Smith Quintet – Live at Smalls (Recorded August 23 & 24, 2009)
 The Ian Hendrickson–Smith Group – Live at Smalls (Recorded February 8 & 9, 2008)
 The Steve Davis Quintet Feat. Larry Willis – Live at Smalls (Recorded January 7 & 8, 2009)
 The Peter Bernstein Quartet Feat. Jimmy Cobb – Live at Smalls (Recorded December 17 & 18, 2008)
 The Dave Kikoski Trio – Live at Smalls (Recorded November 18 & 19, 2008)
 The Kevin Hays Trio – Live at Smalls (Recorded August 13 & 14, 2008)
 The Ryan Kisor Quintet – Live at Smalls (Recorded May 16 & 17, 2008)

References

External links

SmallsLIVE 
Smalls Jazz Club at All About Jazz

1994 establishments in New York City
Drinking establishments in Greenwich Village
Jazz clubs in New York City
Jazz record labels
Music venues completed in 1993